Israel is a masculine given name of Hebrew origin. According to the Book of Genesis, Jacob was given the name Israel after he wrestled with the angel ( and 35:10). The given name is already attested in Eblaite (𒅖𒊏𒅋, išrail) and Ugaritic (𐎊𐎌𐎗𐎛𐎍, yšrʾil). Commentators differ on the original literal interpretation. The text of Genesis etymologizes the name with the root śarah "to rule, contend, have power, prevail over":  (KJV: "a prince hast thou power with God"), but modern suggestions read the el as the subject, for a translation of "El/God rules/judges/struggles", "El fights/struggles".

The name appears on the Merneptah Stele as 𓇌𓊃𓏤𓏤𓂋𓇋𓄿𓂋𓏤 (ysrỉꜣr), referring to a foreign group of people, probably the Israelites.

In Jewish and Christian texts from the Greco-Egyptian area during Second Temple Judaism and beyond the name was understood to mean "a man seeing God" from the ʾyš (man) rʾh (to see) ʾel (God).

Jacob's descendants came to be known as the Israelites, eventually forming the twelve tribes of Israel and ultimately the kingdom of Israel, whence came the name of modern-day State of Israel.

Given name
Isra'il or Jacob in Islam
Israel (Bishop of Caucasian Albania), 7th century CE
Israel (Nestorian patriarch), Patriarch of the Church of the East in 961
Israel Adesanya (born 1989), Nigerian professional mixed martial artist, kickboxer, and boxer.
Israel Alter (1901–1979), Jewish composer and last chief cantor in Hanover, Germany
Israel Asper (1932–2003), Canadian media magnate
Israel of Axum, Emperor of Ethiopia in the 6th century CE
Israel Baker (1919–2011), American violinist and concertmaster
 Israel Baline (1888–1989), the birth name of American composer Irving Berlin
Yisroel Belsky (1938–2016), American rosh yeshiva and posek
Israel Bissell (1752–1823), American post rider and colonial militia officer
Yisrael Campbell, American-born Israeli comedian
Israel Cruz (born 1983), Australian singer
Israel Dagg (born 1988), New Zealand rugby player
Israel ben Eliezer (1698–1760), Jewish mystical rabbi
Israel Elimelech (born 1960), Israeli basketball player
Israel Englander (born 1948), American billionaire hedge fund manager 
Israel Lewis Feinberg (1872–1941), American physician and coroner
Israel Finkelstein (born 1949), Israeli archaeologist
Israel Folau (born 1989), Australian rugby player
Yisrael Friedman of Ruzhin (1796–1850), Hasidic rebbe
Israel Gelfand (1913–2009), Russian mathematician
Israil Gurung, Indian footballer
Israel Gigato (born 1987), Spanish football player
Israel the Grammarian, 10th-century European scholar
Israel Hands, 18th-century pirate
Yisroel Hopstein (1737–1814), Maggid of Kozhnitz
Israel Houghton (born 1971), American singer and Christian worship leader
Israel Idonije (born 1980), Nigeria-born Canadian player of American football
Israel Jacob (1729–1803), Prussian banker and philanthropist 
Israel Jacobs (1726–c. 1796), British-American colonial legislator
Israel Jacobson (1768–1828), German philanthropist and communal organiser
Israel Joffe, American writer, journalist and United States government official
Yisrael Meir Kagan (1838–1933), rabbi and posek known as the Chofetz Chaim
Israel Kamakawiwoʻole (1959–1997), Hawaiian singer and spiritual leader
Yisrael Mendel Kaplan (1913–1985), teacher at Chicago's Hebrew Theological College
Israel Katz (born 1955), Israeli politician
Yisrael Katz (1927–2010), Israeli scholar and civil servant
Israel Keyes (1978–2012), American serial killer, rapist, bank robber, burglar, and arsonist
Israel Kirzner (born 1930), American economist
Israel Jacob Kligler (1888–1944), Austo-Hungarian microbiologist, professor, and Zionist
Israel of Krems, 14th-/15th-century Austrian rabbi
Yisrael Kristal (1903–2017), Polish-Israeli supercentenarian
Israel "Izzy" Lang, American football running back
Yisrael Meir Lau (born 1937), former Chief Rabbi of Israel
Israel Levitan (1912–1982), American sculptor and painter
Israel Lewy (1841–1917), German scholar of Judaic texts
Israel Lovy (1773–1832), European ḥazzan and composer
Israel Machado (born 1960), Brazilian basketball player
Mohammad Israil Mansuri, Indian politician
Israel Mireles (born c.1983), Mexican convicted murderer
Israel Mukuamu (born 1999), American football player
Israel Ochoa (born 1964), Colombian cyclist
Yisroel Ber Odesser (1888–1994), Breslov rabbi
Israel Ori (1658–1711), Armenian diplomat
Israel Pellew (1758–1832), British admiral
Israel Pickens (1780–1827), American lawyer and politician
Israel Pliner (1896–1939), Soviet secret police functionary
Yisroel Avrohom Portugal (1923–2019), Skulener Rebbe 
Israel Putnam (1718–1790), American general
Israel Raybon (born 1973), American football player
Israel Regardie (1907–1985), British occultist
Israel B. Richardson (1815–1862), American general
Israel Rivera, American soldier witness to Abu Grahib conditions
Israel Ruiz Jr. (born 1943), New York politician
Ysrael Seinuk (1931–2010), Cuban structural engineer
Israel Shahak (1933–2001), Israeli author
Israel Shamir (born 1947), Swedish antisemitic writer
Israel Sheinfeld (born 1976), Israeli basketball player
Israel Vázquez (born 1977), Mexican boxer
Israel Wachser (1892–1919), Russian writer
Yisroel Dovid Weiss (born 1956), Neturei Karta activist
Israel Zilber (1933 – after 1980) Latvian-Soviet chess player
Ysrael Zúñiga (born 1976), Peruvian footballer

Surname
Al Israel (1936-2011), American actor
Edward Israel (1859–1884), American astronomer and polar explorer
Gerli Israel (born 1995), Estonian footballer
Guni Israeli (born 1984), Israeli basketball player
Jonathan Israel (born 1946), British historian
Lee Israel (1939–2014), American author known for committing literary forgery
Märt Israel (born 1983), Estonian discus thrower
 Melvin Israel, later known as Mel Allen (1913–1996), American sportscaster
Menasseh Ben Israel (1604–1657), Portuguese rabbi and scholar
Rinus Israël (born 1942), Dutch football player and manager
Robert Decatur Israel (1826-1908), San Diego pioneer, keeper of the Old Point Loma lighthouse
Samuel Israel III (born 1959), American convicted felon and former hedge fund manager
Scott Israel (born 1956/57), American Police Chief of Opa-locka, former Sheriff of Broward County
Steve Israel (born 1958), American politician
Steve Israel (American football) (born 1969), American football player
Syed Shah Israil, 16th-century writer of Bengal
Wilfrid Israel (1899–1943), Anglo-German businessman and philanthropist
Yuri Izrael (1930–2014), Russian scientist and vice-chairman of the Intergovernmental Panel on Climate Change

References

Surnames
Jewish surnames
Given names
Masculine given names
Hebrew masculine given names
English masculine given names
Country name etymology
Theophoric names